A list of fireless steam locomotives preserved in Britain.

Barclay locomotives

Locomotives built by Andrew Barclay:

Works number/build date, site of preservation

 1472/1916, Bressingham Steam Museum
 1473/1916, Swansea Industrial and Maritime Museum
 1477/1916, Buckinghamshire Railway Centre
 1550/1917, On static display at HM Factory, Gretna
 1571/1917, Glasgow Museum of Transport
 1572/1917, Carnforth, Lancs
 1815/1924, Snibston Discovery Park, Coalville, Leics
 1876/1925, Sittingbourne and Kemsley Light Railway
 1944/1927, Telford Steam Railway, Shropshire
 1950/1928, Ribble Steam Railway, Preston, Lancs
 1952/1928, Scottish Industrial Railway Centre
 1966/1929, National Museum of Wales, Nantgarw
 1984/1930, West Somerset Restoration, Williton 
 1989/1930, Bo'ness and Kinneil Railway
 2008/1935, Midland Railway - Butterley, Derbyshire
 2126/1942, National Waterways Museum, Gloucestershire
 2238/1948, National Museum of Wales, Nantgarw
 2243/1948, Buckinghamshire Railway Centre
 2268/1949, Carnforth, Lancs
 2373/1956, National Railway Museum, York

Bagnall locomotives

Locomotives built by W.G. Bagnall:

Works number/build date, site of preservation

 2216/1923, Sittingbourne and Kemsley Light Railway (2 ft 6in gauge)
 2370/1929, In a field near Blaby, Leicester, visible from the Leicester to Nuneaton railway line
 2473/1932, Privately preserved in West Yorkshire
 2898/1948, Darlington
 3019/1952, Worksop, Notts. K J Bownes & Sons Depot 
 3121/1957, Bodmin and Wenford Railway

Other locomotives

Locomotives built by other manufacturers:

Builder, works number/build date, site of preservation

 Hawthorn Leslie, 3746/1929, Tanfield Railway
 Robert Stephenson and Hawthorns, 7803/1954, Stonham Barns Leisure & Retail Village
 Peckett and Sons, 2155/1955, Irlam, Salford, Manchester

See also
 List of preserved British industrial steam locomotives

Sources

References

F
F
Fireless steam locomotives